Jefferson John Guy, known and published as Jeff Guy (13 June 1940 – 15 December 2014) was a well known and published academic historian whose main interest was the history of Natal and the Zulu people.

Early life
Guy attended school in Pietermaritzburg, for a few years after completing his schooling he worked on farms in Britain and the then Rhodesia, and was briefly in the military as a sailor and soldier. In 1963 he registered for a degree in English at the University of Natal, but switched courses to History under the influence of Colin Webb. After graduating with an Honours degree in history he travelled to the U.K. and began a Ph.D degree in history with Shula Marks as his supervisor. His Ph.D thesis was later published as The Destruction of the Zulu Kingdom: The Civil War in Zululand, 1879-1884

Career
After graduating with the Ph.D degree, Guy taught for a while in London, but later moved to Lesotho where he lectured history at the Roma campus of what was then the University of Botswana, Lesotho and Swaziland. He left Lesotho for a position as a history lecturer at the University of Trondheim in Norway. In 1992 he returned to South Africa and became head of the history department at the Durban campus of the University of Natal.

Personal life
While studying for his doctoral degree in London he met and married Naimi Haque. His two children with Naimi, Heli and Joe were raised in Lesotho. Guy died at Heathrow Airport while travelling back home to South Africa after attending a conference and giving a lecture marking the bicentenary of the birth of John Colenso, the first bishop of Natal.

Published works

 with Richard L. Cope

References

Citations

Sources

Further reading

20th-century South African historians
1940 births
2014 deaths
21st-century South African historians